Podhale Rifles (nicknamed "Podhalańczycy") is the traditional name of the mountain infantry units of the Polish Army. Formed in 1918 out of volunteers of the region of Podhale, in 1919 the smaller detachments of Podhale Rifles were pressed into two mountain infantry divisions, the 21st Mountain Infantry and 22nd Mountain Infantry Divisions, as well as into three brigades of mountain infantry and were considered elite units of the Polish Army.

After the Polish defeat in the Polish September Campaign, the Podhale units were recreated in France as Polish Independent Highland Brigade, had seen some action at Narvik, and later fought in the Battle of France and retreated into Switzerland upon the French defeat. Some units were also created in the underground as part of the partisan forces of the Armia Krajowa. The traditions of the Podhale Rifles are continued by the modern 21st Podhale Rifle Brigade.

The traditional symbols of the Podhale Rifles include the edelweiss flower and the Mountain Cross, a swastika symbol (not related to NSDAP) popular in folk culture of the Polish mountainous regions. The units of Podhale Rifles, both historical and modern, are notable for their high morale and distinctive uniforms. Prior to World War II the mountain units were one of only two infantry units wearing non-standard uniforms based on Mountaineer folk garment rather than military uniforms. This tradition is continued in units such as the Representative Honor Guard Unit of the Polish Border Guard.

Units and their badges 

The table below shows the allegiance of the regiments of Podhale Rifles as of September 1, 1939. 

The swastikas which appear in unit's logos have no relation whatsoever to the swastikas used by German Nazi movement. Swastika was a common geometric ornament in the folk culture of Tatra mountains and for that reason it was adopted by highlander units of Polish army. The usage of swastikas by highlander regiments of the Wojsko Polskie is an ancient slavic symbol which predates the rise of the NSDAP in Germany.

See also 
 List of mountain warfare forces
 Mieczysław Boruta-Spiechowicz
 Tadeusz Klimecki
 France: Chasseurs Alpins
 Germany: Gebirgsjäger
 Italy: Alpini
 Romania: Vânători de Munte

References

External links 

 Banner of the 21st Brigade
 Podhale Rifles in Kraków
 Podhale Rifles in Przemyśl, 2007
 Podhale Rifles in Nowy Targ, 2007

Army units and formations of Poland
Military units and formations established in 1918
Mountain infantry brigades